Eriospermum paradoxum ("haasklossie") is a species of geophytic plant of the genus Eriospermum, indigenous to southern Africa. Its habitat is sandy or rocky clay soils in arid winter-rainfall areas.

References 

Renosterveld
paradoxum